Jesus Calling: Enjoying Peace in His Presence (2004) is a daily devotional book written by Christian author Sarah Young and published by Integrity Publishers, based in Brentwood, TN. Two years later in September 2006 Integrity, along with its catalog of books, including "Jesus Calling", were bought by Thomas Nelson. The book offers readers a 365-day personal spiritual journey intended to help the reader experience a deeper relationship with Jesus. The book was inspired, in part, Sarah Young's reading of a related book God Calling, authored by A. J. Russell. According to Publishers Weekly, Jesus Calling had sold 30 million copies as of 2015.

Sarah’s writings also include Jesus Listens, Jesus Always, Jesus Today, Jesus Lives, Dear Jesus, Jesus Calling for Little Ones, Jesus Calling Bible Storybook, Jesus Calling: 365 Devotions for Kids, Peace in His Presence, and more, each encouraging readers in their journeys toward intimacy with Christ. 

Jesus Calling is more than a devotional book. It is also a Christian brand whose offerings include a quarterly  magazine, TV Show, Podcast with over 7 million downloads, and daily inspiration over email and social media.

Author 
Sarah Young has a degree in philosophy from Wellesley College; and earned a master's degree in biblical studies and counseling from Covenant Theological Seminary in St. Louis.

Young is a member of the Presbyterian Church in America (PCA), where her husband Stephen is an ordained minister and third-generation Christian missionary to Japan. The couple served as Mission to the World missionaries in Japan and Australia. They currently reside in the United States, where Young has two married children and two grandchildren.

Young has been described as a humble person who prefers to stay out of the spotlight. Both The New York Times and Christianity Today had interviews with Young by email. The Daily Beast referred to Jesus Calling as “The Evangelical Bestseller You’ve Never Heard Of.”

Impact 
A Jesus Calling podcast features stories from readers of Jesus Calling and focuses on how the devotional has made a difference in their lives. Phil Keaggy, a Gospel Music Association (GMA) Dove Award-winning performer, provided the background music and offered his services because Jesus Calling has positively impacted his family.

On April 25, 2015, Wisconsin Governor Scott Walker read from Jesus Calling to more than 1,000 people at the Iowa Faith & Freedom Coalition. A HarperCollins publicist said, "We had no idea Scott Walker had the book and would use it. It's always nice to hear about how 'Jesus Calling' touched someone's life."

On June 27, 2017, Louisiana First Lady Donna Edwards delivered copies of Jesus Calling to women prisoners of the Louisiana Correctional Institute for Women.  The books were donated by The Next Door, a non-profit organization that serves women in crisis and provides Jesus Calling devotionals free of charge to jails and prisons.

White House Press Secretary Sarah Huckabee Sanders read her leather-bound Jesus Calling daily devotional before press conferences.

Other works 
Other books written by Sarah Young include:

 Jesus Today -  ECPA's 2013 Christian Book of the Year.
Jesus Always - ECPA's 2018 Christian Book of the Year.
 Jesus Listens - ECPA Christian Best Sellers.

Criticism 

Jesus Calling has prompted objections from within the evangelical community. The book is written in the voice of Jesus Christ speaking directly to the reader and thereby claiming new revelation from God.  The practice of automatic writing while receiving messages is central to the controversy. David Crump, professor of religion at Calvin College, told Christianity Today that Young "puts her thoughts into the first person and then presents that ‘person’ as the resurrected Lord" and said he is tempted to call this "blasphemy".

Publisher Thomas Nelson removed references to automatic writing from the book's introduction and claims the book contains Young's own thoughts and inspirations.

See also 

 Christian literature
 Christian devotional literature
 Spiritual disciplines

References

Bibliography 
  
Young, Sarah (2012). Jesus Lives: Seeing His Love in Your Life. Nashville, Tennessee: Thomas Nelson. 
Young, Sarah (2016), Jesus Always: Embracing Joy in His Presence. Nashville, Tennessee: Thomas Nelson.

Books about Christianity
2004 non-fiction books
Self-help books
Channelled texts
Christian devotional literature
Controversies in Christian literature